The Kings River slender salamander (Batrachoseps regius) is a species of salamander in the family Plethodontidae.  It is endemic to California, in Fresno County in the western United States.

Distribution

Its natural habitats are the temperate Kings River riparian and interior chaparral and woodlands, and the Summit Meadow temperate coniferous forests.

Conservation
Known from only the two locations, it is an IUCN Red List Vulnerable species.

References

External links
IUCN: all species searchpage

Batrachoseps
Salamander
Salamander
Fauna of the Sierra Nevada (United States)
Kings Canyon National Park
Natural history of Fresno County, California
Taxonomy articles created by Polbot
Amphibians described in 1998